New Salem is an unincorporated community and census-designated place located in Menallen Township, Fayette County, Pennsylvania, United States. It was formerly part of the New Salem-Buffington CDP, before it was split into two separate CDPs for the 2010 census. The population of New Salem was 579 as of the 2010 census.

Geography

New Salem is located in western Fayette County, in the southwestern part of Menallen Township. It is bordered to the west by Buffington and to the south, across Dunlap Creek, by German Township. New Salem Road leads southeast  to Uniontown, the county seat, and northwest  to Pennsylvania Route 166 south of Republic.

Demographics

References

Census-designated places in Fayette County, Pennsylvania
Census-designated places in Pennsylvania